The Canadian women's national ice hockey team is the ice hockey team representing Canada in women's hockey. The team is overseen by Hockey Canada, a member of the International Ice Hockey Federation and participates in international competitions. Canada has been a dominant figure in international competition, having won the majority of major ice hockey tournaments. Canada is rivaled by the United States, the only other winner of a major tournament.

Competition achievements

Olympic Games

World Championships

4 Nations Cup

Pacific Rim Championship

Team

Current roster
Roster for the 2023 IIHF Women's World Championship.

Head coach: Troy Ryan

Development team roster
Roster for the 2022 Collegiate Series.

Head coach: Kori Cheverie

Coaches

 Dave McMaster, 1990
 Rick Polutnick, 1992
 Les Lawton, 1994
 Shannon Miller, 1997–1998
 Danièle Sauvageau, 1999, 2001–2002
 Melody Davidson, 2000, 2005–2007, 2009–2010
 Karen Hughes, 2004
 Peter Smith, 2008
 Ryan Walter, 2011
 Dan Church, 2012–2013
 Kevin Dineen, 2013–2014
 Doug Derraugh, 2015
 Laura Schuler, 2016–2018
 Perry Pearn, 2018–2019

General managers
Melody Davidson, 2010–2018
Gina Kingsbury, 2018–present

See also

2009–10 Canada women's national ice hockey team
2010–11 Canada women's national ice hockey team

References

External links

IIHF profile

 
 
Women's national ice hockey teams
1987 establishments in Canada
National ice hockey teams in the Americas